A Connecticut Yankee in King Arthur's Court is a studio album of phonograph records by Bing Crosby and other stars of the Paramount movie A Connecticut Yankee in King Arthur's Court featuring songs from the film. All of the songs were written by Jimmy Van Heusen and Johnny Burke.

Reception
Billboard liked it saying:
Crosby’s in rare form for this album of tunes from the Connecticut Yankee flick. His work on the top ballad "Once" is more reminiscent of the Bing of the thirties than anything he’s done in a long while – and the song is a natural. (It’s done twice here – one by Bing as a solo and again as a reprise with Rhonda Fleming). Other tune to watch is "Stub," which could have the makings of another "Swing on a Star".  Also represented from the original cast are Murvyn Vye, Bill Bendix and Cedric Hardwicke. If picture is as big as advance word has it, then album is in.

The album reached the No. 5 position in Billboard's album charts.

Track listing
These newly issued songs were featured in a 3-disc, 78 rpm album set, Decca Album A-699.

*This song was cut from the film after its world premiere at Radio City Music Hall, New York.

Other releases
Decca included all the Crosby songs on Decca DL 4261 in 1962 for the LP set Bing’s Hollywood.

References

Bing Crosby albums
1949 albums
Decca Records albums